Taittinger is a French wine family who are famous producers of Champagne. The estate is currently headed by Vitalie Taittinger, who is the daughter of Pierre-Emmanuel Taittinger (born 1953), a member of the consultative committee of the Banque de France. Its diversified holdings included Champagne Taittinger, Société du Louvre and Concorde Hotels, whose flagship is the famed Hotel de Crillon on the Place de la Concorde in Paris, France as well as the Loire Valley wine-producing firm of Bouvet-Ladubay, and a partnership in Domaine Carneros in California, until it was sold to Starwood Capital in 2005.

Champagne production
Founded in 1734, the Taittinger Champagne house is based in Reims. The flagship wines of the house are the Comtes de Champagne (composed of 100% Chardonnay) and Comtes de Champagne Rosé (70% Pinot noir and 30% Chardonnay). In 2017, Taittinger planted its first vines in England, near a village in Kent, for its venture into English sparkling wine. The first bottle will be ready in 2023.

History

In 1734, Jacques Fourneaux established a wine-business in Champagne and worked closely with the Benedictine Abbeys which, at that time, owned the finest vineyards in the region. After the First World War, the wine-house was moved to a large mansion on the Rue de Tambour in which Theobald I of Navarre (1201–1253) had lived. A long-standing legend held that it was he who brought the Chardonnay grape from Cyprus on returning from a crusade in the Middle Ages. This claim has been disproved by using genetic analysis, ascertained at the University of California at Davis.

The Taittingers were a family of wine merchants who, in 1870, moved to the Paris region from the Lorraine in order to retain their French citizenship after the Franco-Prussian War and the Treaty of Frankfurt (1871).

In 1932, Pierre Taittinger bought the Château de la Marquetterie from the wine house of Forest-Fourneaux. It had been used as a command post during World War I and he had been laid up there after suffering a heart-attack during combat. The vineyards of the château had been planted with Chardonnay and Pinot noir since the 18th Century. This property had been developed by Brother Jean Oudart, a Benedictine monk, one of the founding fathers of champagne wine, and later it had belonged to the writer Jacques Cazotte.

From 1945 to 1960 the business was run by Pierre's third son François. Under his direction, the Taittinger cellars were established in the Abbey of Saint-Nicaise, built in the thirteenth century in Gallo-Roman chalk pits dating from the fourth century. After François' death in an accident, his brother Claude took over and directed the business from 1960 to 2005. It was during this time that Taittinger became a champagne house of world renown.

Champagne Taittinger was sold in July 2005 by the Taittinger family, along with its subsidiary, Société du Louvre, to the U.S. private investment firm Starwood Capital Group. Those in the profession (Champagne houses, wine-producers, cooperatives, distributors and customers) proposed that the objectives of short-term profitability, or even medium term, at any price, advocated by the then current managers of the business, were not compatible with the production of Champagne wine of quality, which takes time, trust and a large delegation of authority to the masters of the cellar. In addition, the arrival of investors completely foreign to the culture of Champagne could result in a major breakdown of the equilibrium of the industry.

Finally, on 31 May 2006, the Northeast Regional Bank of the Crédit Agricole, in collaboration with Pierre-Emmanuel Taittinger, bought the business for 660 million euros. The area covers 288.84 hectares of vineyards and has 12 to 13 million bottles in stock. The Château de la Marquetterie and its cellars were part of the overall purchase. The Starwood group retained some of the hotels, including luxury hotels Crillon, Lutetia and Martinez, and the hotel chains Campanile and Kyriad.

Claude Taittinger retired in 2006 and his nephew Pierre-Emmanuel Taittinger replaced him as head of the business.

In 2017, it was announced, Taittinger became the first champagne house to plant vines in the UK. Champagne Taittinger entered into a joint venture with UK wine agents Hatch Mansfield and in 2015 bought up land in Chilham, Kent, to plant 40 hectares of vines over the next three years.

In October 2019 it was announced that Vitalie Taittinger will become president from December 31, 2019. She has been working for the company for 12 years and is currently director of marketing and communications. She will now undertake her new responsibilities with the support of Damien le Sueur (general manager) and her brother Clovis Taittinger, who will be promoted to general manager.

See also
 List of Champagne houses

References

External links
Taittinger website

1734 establishments in France
Champagne producers
Wine merchants